Leonardo Araya (born 15 February 1982) is a former footballer who played as a defender. He was a member of the Costa Rica national squad that played at the 2004 Olympic men's football tournament.

References

1982 births
Living people
Footballers at the 2004 Summer Olympics
Association football defenders
Costa Rican footballers
Olympic footballers of Costa Rica